Squads for the 1988 AFC Asian Cup tournament in Qatar.

Group A

Iran

Head coach: Parviz Dehdari

Japan

Head coach:  Kenzo Yokoyama

''Caps & Goals listed are recognized career totals while all other stats are listed as they were on 2 December 1988 the tournament's opening day.

South Korea

Head coach:  Lee Hoi-Taek

Qatar

Head coach:  Procópio Cardoso

United Arab Emirates

Head coach:  Mario Zagallo

Group B

Bahrain

Head coach: Mohammed Al Arabi

China PR

Head coach: Gao Fengwen

Kuwait

Head coach:  Miguel Pereira

Saudi Arabia

Head coach:  Carlos Alberto Parreira

Syria

Head coach:  Anatoliy Azarenkov

References
RSSSF details
亚洲杯 at cnsoccer.titan24.com

AFC Asian Cup squads